The Cardiff Redhawks are a Welsh ice hockey team that play in the First and Third Divisions of the British Universities Ice Hockey Association, formed in 2004. They play their home games at Viola Arena, Cardiff, Wales.

Introduction

The Cardiff Redhawks were formed in 2004 by a handful of students from Cardiff University, many of whom had never played before. Their first game was against a local team, the Cardiff Titans, on 7 May 2005 following an NHL exhibition game. The squad began to grow by bringing in players from neighbouring universities such as UWIC, Glamorgan, Swansea and Newport. The Redhawks 1st team has traditionally played in BUIHA Division 1 but after a tough season in 2013/14, were relegated to Division 2 in order to partake in more competitive games.

Uniform

The Redhawks have used 3 different jerseys in their time in the BUIHA. The first incarnation was a simple black jersey with red stripes on the sleeves and the original team logo.

Since then a dark red strip has replaced it as the club's main jersey. The introduction of this jersey also saw the first use of the current hawks head logo. Due to BUIHA regulations the team also added a white version of the jersey in 2008.

A third jersey has since been designed, which will hopefully be used in an Alumni match in the near future.

BUIHA Record

2005–06

In September 2005 the Redhawks joined the BUIHA, entering teams in the Second (Southern) and Third Divisions. The year proved to be very successful; with the A Team securing second place in their division as well as the Second Tier National Tournament title, and the B Team were runners up in the Third Tier Nationals.

2006–07

The following year began with the closure of the Wales National Ice Rink and the construction of the Cardiff Bay Ice Rink. Delays in construction left the Redhawks without a home for much of the 2006–07 season, forcing the A Team to withdraw from the league.

The A Team represented themselves in Tier One of the 2007 BUIHA Nationals, but fared poorly, losing all their matches and placing bottom. The Redhawks found solace in the success of the B Team who managed to improve on their previous season, winning the Third Tier Nationals.

2007–08

The 2007–08 season saw the Redhawks regain their stability; the A Team returned to Tier Two South, with the B Team entering their third season in Tier Three. The Redhawks also gained membership to the Cardiff University Athletic Union.

Once again the A Team clinched second place with a post Christmas undefeated streak. They fell short though in the Nationals, managing only 5th place. The B Team overachieved once again, settling for 3rd place in a much more competitive Tier Three tournament.

2008–09

The 2008–09 season saw the A team win Tier Two 2 South, before losing in the Tier Two Playoffs. The B team competed a clean sweep of trophies, winning Tier Three South, the Tier Three Playoffs and the Celtic Plate. They went on to win the Tier Three Nationals, dramatically winning both their semi-final and final on penalty shots, with netminder Tom Martin stopping 6 out of 6 shots, the game-winning goal in the final came courtesy of Jon Griffiths.

2009–10

The A team made the jump to Tier 1 South and despite getting off to a good start by beating Warwick at home 5–3 the Redhawks soon found themselves struggling with a short bench and they were on the receiving end of some heavy defeats all season long and they finished in last place.

The B team, having lost a lot of the previous year's team including their top 4 points scorers (Matt Wood, Jiri Podval, Jim "Frodo" Towers and Jon Griffiths), struggled to find the form from last season finishing second in Tier 3 South and being knocked out in the group stages of Nationals.

2010–11

Despite the heavy losses the previous season the A-Team remained in Tier 1 South where they looked to improve their record. Before the season had started the team lost some key names in Adam Landriault, Brian Winstanley, Jon Griifiths and Matt Wood. Things didn't get much better once the season began when the team received a 17–3 defeat away at Oxford (although this was an improvement on the 23–5 loss that took place the year before). The next game saw things go from bad to worse when London Dragons made their visit to the Welsh capital in a game that saw 3 Redhawks ejected in what had been a promising first period where they were trailing by just one goal almost up until the buzzer. The second and third periods saw the flood gates open as player coach Evan Juurakko was also ejected taking Cardiff down to 8 skaters who were helpless to stop the final score reaching 14–0 in the home opener. Despite this Cardiff picked up 4 points on the year and reduced their goals against average by nearly 3 goals a game on last year.

The B team finished as runners up of Tier 3 South for the second year running to the Warwick Panthers in the cup competition having lost both match ups during the season. Looking to improve on the previous year's record at Nationals they went undefeated and capped the tournament's group stage with a 1–0 shutout for Dan Jenkins over the Nottingham Mavericks C Team. However this wouldn't be enough as two costly draws with the Manchester Metros and the Sheffield Bears as well as a penalty point would be enough to prevent them advancing to the semi-finals.

2011–12

The A team enjoyed a successful year having dropped back to Division 2 South in an effort to play more competitive games and develop players capable of playing checking hockey. Winning the Division 2 South title entered them for the Division 2 National play-off.

The B team retained the Celtic Plate on a trip to Kirkcaldy, Scotland with a narrow victory over the Edinburgh Beagles. They finished as runners-up in Division 3 South to a strong Southampton Spitfires B team and met the same opposition in the Division 3 Nationals final.

This season saw the introduction of a third team, a further developmental squad allowing more players to participate in competitive hockey. The C-hawks found their feet at the National Championships holding reigning champions Warwick Panthers B to a draw before winning their final game with a 1–0 victory over Bradford Sabres C. The winning goal (and the first in C-hawks history) was credited to Matt 'Mine's a tight one' Lawson.

The Celtic Cup

The Redhawks also participate in the Celtic Cup Varsity; an annual one off challenge game against the Edinburgh Eagles who are the only other non-English team in the BUIHA.

The competition has run since 2006, the location alternating between Cardiff Bay and Murrayfield, Edinburgh. The 2009 match was held in Cardiff, on 14 March. The game ended as a 4–1 defeat for Cardiff, the closest they've come to the cup yet. 2012 saw the re-emergence of the Celtic Cup with the Edinburgh Eagles running out 11–1 winners.

The Celtic Plate

2009 also saw the introduction of the Celtic Plate; a secondary competition between the Cardiff and Edinburgh B Teams. This was held on 15 March, seeing the Redhawks B win the plate with a 5–3 victory.

The Celtic Plate re-appeared in February 2012 when the Cardiff Redhawks B team beat the Beagles 4–3 in a hard-fought contest at Fife Ice Arena, Kirkcaldy, perhaps the longest journey undertaken by a BUIHA team for a domestic fixture.

Club honours
 2005–06 
 BUIHA Tier Two Nationals Champions (The Hopkins Plate)

 2006–07 
 BUIHA Tier Three Nationals Champions

 2008–09 
 BUIHA Tier Two Southern Conference Champions
 BUIHA Tier Three Nationals Champions
 BUIHA Tier Three Southern Conference Champions
 BUIHA Tier Three Playoff Champions
 Celtic Plate Winners

 2011–12 
 BUIHA Tier Two Southern Conference Champions
 Celtic Plate Winners
 BUIHA Tier Three Nationals Runners-up

Current A Team Roster
2015-16

Current B Team Roster
2017-2018

Past Players

Great Britain Universities Squad Members
 2006 
 Tom Smith
 2009 
 Suzi Grieve
 Cath Homolka
 2011 
 Suzi Grieve

References

External links
Cardiff Redhawks official web site
Cardiff University official web site

Ice hockey clubs established in 2004
2004 establishments in Wales
Ice hockey teams in Wales
University ice hockey in the United Kingdom